Stephanie Loesch (born 5 April 1988) is a German rhythmic gymnast. She represents her nation at international competitions. 

She competed at the 2005 World Rhythmic Gymnastics Championships in Baku, Azerbaijan.

References

1988 births
German rhythmic gymnasts
21st-century German women
Living people
Place of birth missing (living people)